Pratt Institute Libraries is the academic library system of Pratt Institute. The main library is located on the main campus in Brooklyn, NY, with a branch library in Manhattan. The collection focus includes the arts, architecture, design, information science and allied fields. Holdings include 200,000 printed volumes, over 600 periodicals, rare books, digital images resources including Pratt Institute specific Digital Image Collection, and the Institute's archives. It has the distinction of being the “first free public library in Brooklyn”  and its Brooklyn building is a New York City designated landmark.

History
The library at Pratt Institute opened in 1888 in the Main Building on Pratt's campus in the Clinton Hill neighborhood of Brooklyn. The library moved into a new building located on Ryerson Street in May 1896. Originally called the Pratt Institute Free Library, it was open to anyone who lived or worked in Brooklyn.  Branch libraries of the Pratt Institute Free Library included the Astral Branch—located on the ground floor of the Astral Apartments (another Charles Pratt initiative), and the Long Island Branch at 571 Atlantic Ave. By 1940 the Pratt Libraries closed to the public, partly because the Brooklyn Public Library was able to support the needs of the community.

Some scenes from the 1978 adult film Debbie Does Dallas were filmed in the library.

Architecture

The building was designed by William B. Tubby, with interiors by Tiffany & Company. The three-story brick building was designed in a Renaissance Revival style. A feature of the interior is a marble staircase and pillars. The floors of the book stacks are made of glass and the stacks are a design by Library Bureau, which include oak shelves and copper-plated iron supports. Early renovations included the addition of a Children's Porch in 1912 to provide direct access to the Children's Room. The North Porch was added in the 1930s by architect John Mead Howells. Renovations in the early 1980s by architects Giorgio Cavaglieri and Warren Gran included the removal of the Children's Porch to another building on campus, an underground extension including additional stacks, study areas, and classroom with an outdoor mall above, and the addition of a climate-control system. In 1981 the library building in Brooklyn was officially designated a New York City Landmark by the New York City Landmarks Preservation Commission.

Notable librarians
 Mary Wright Plummer - Founder of the Pratt Library School, director of the Pratt Libraries beginning in 1895, and director of ALA for the 1915-16 year.  
 Isabel Ely Lord - Author, editor and Head Librarian for Pratt Institute from 1904 until 1910, and director of the School of Household Sciences and Arts at Pratt. 
 Anne Carroll Moore - Librarian at Pratt Library from 1896-1906, and early advocate for children's libraries.
 Josephine Adams Rathbone - President of the American Library Association in 1931–32, "chief instructor" in the Pratt Institute Library School from 1895-1911, and vice-director of the Pratt Institute school from 1911-1938.
 Edward Francis Stevens - Head of Applied Sciences Reference Department at Pratt Institute Free Library from 1903-1910, and Librarian at Pratt Library and Director of Pratt School of Library Science from 1911-1938. 
 Wayne Shirley - Director of Pratt Library, Dean of the Pratt Library School and co-founder of the ALA American Library History Round Table.
 Rice Estes - Director of Pratt Institute Libraries from 1955-1972, and husband of librarian and Newbery Award winning children's author Eleanor Estes.

References

External links

Libraries in Brooklyn
New York City Designated Landmarks in Brooklyn
University and college academic libraries in the United States